Christopher Komla Dewornu is a former Ghanaian police officer and was the acting Inspector General of Police of the Ghana Police Service from 12 June 1986 to 31 October 1986. He was appointed the substantive IGP from 1 November 1986 to 31 December 1989.

References

Ghanaian police officers
Ghanaian Inspector Generals of Police
Possibly living people
Members of the Council of State (Ghana)